Chiquito River may refer to:

Chiquito River (Guayama, Puerto Rico)
Chiquito River (Ponce, Puerto Rico)
Chiquito River (Yauco, Puerto Rico)

See also 
Chiquito (disambiguation)